Kamala Sankrityayan (1920-2009) was a 20th century Indian writer, editor and scholar of Hindi and Nepali literature. She was the wife of the renowned historian Rahul Sankrityayan.

Biography 
Kamala Sankrityayan was born on 15 August 1920 in Kalimpong in West Bengal to father Chandraman Pariyar and mother Chandramaya Pariyar in a Nepali Dalit Damai family. She passed her matriculation-level education in 1947. She was awarded a doctorate from Agra University, and was married to historian Rahul Sankrityayan. They had one son, Jeta, and a daughter Jaya.

Career

Sankrityayan was a well known writer, scholar and translator. She translated Valmiki's Ramayana in Nepali. She also remained a member of The National Bibliography of Indian Literature (1901–1953). She also wrote books like The Ramayana Tradition in Asia, Mahamanav Mahapandit, Prabha, Nepali Sahitya etc. She was well versed in many languages. 

She actively participated in the field of Nepali and Hindi literature since the 1950s and the recipient of numerous Regional and National awards in Hindi and Nepali Literature.  She was honoured with Bhanu Puraskar in 1982 and Mahapandit Rahul Sankrityayan Award in 1993, for her creation and compile of essays Bichar Tatha Biwechana. She has contributed 13 different Hindi and Nepali books and more than 500 piece of writing on her credits, equally responsible for the creation of Indian Literature Encyclopedia. She was also the head of Hindi Dept., Loreto College, Darjeeling. Her last book Dibya Mani was published in 2008.

Books 
The Ramayana Tradition in Asia
Mahamanav Mahapandit – 1995
Prabha – 1994
Nepali Sahitya – 1986
Assam Ki Lokkathayen  – 1981–1993
Dibya Mani – 2008
Bichar Tatha Biwechana

References

External links 
 Great Litterateur Dr. Kamala Sankrityayan passed away.
 Tribute to Late Dr. Kamala Sankrityayan.
 डा. कमला सांकृत्यायन का निधन

1920 births
2009 deaths
20th-century Indian women writers
Hindi-language writers
People from Darjeeling district
People from Kalimpong district
Women writers from West Bengal
Indian writers
Nepali-language writers
20th-century Indian translators
20th-century Indian historians
Indian women historians
Indian women scholars
Scholars from West Bengal
20th-century Indian women scientists
20th-century Indian scientists
Women scientists from West Bengal
Indian women translators
Women educators from West Bengal
Educators from West Bengal
Nepali-language poets from India
Nepali-language writers from India
Khas people